Golden Hill or Golden Hills may refer to:

Places

China
Golden Hill, Hong Kong, a mountain

South Africa
Golden Hill, Western Cape, a suburb in Somerset West

United Kingdom
Golden Hill, Bristol, a suburb
Golden Hill Fort, Isle of Wight

United States
Golden Hill (New York), a mountain in the Catskills
Golden Hills, California, a census-designated place in Kern County
Golden Hill, San Diego, an urban neighborhood
Golden Hill, Indiana, an unincorporated community in White County
Golden Hill Historic District (Indianapolis, Indiana), a wealthy historic neighborhood in Indianapolis, Indiana
Golden Hill Paugussett Indian Nation, Connecticut
Golden Hill State Park, in Niagara County, New York

Other
Battle of Golden Hill, a 1770 clash between British soldiers and the Sons of Liberty in New York City
Golden Hill (novel), a 2016 novel by Francis Spufford